PA16 may refer to:
 Pennsylvania Route 16
 Pennsylvania's 16th congressional district
 Piper PA-16 Clipper